Ţigăneşti may refer to:

Țigănești, Teleorman, a commune in Teleorman County, Romania
Ţigăneşti, a village administered by Topoloveni town, Argeș County, Romania
Ţigăneşti, a village in Vultureni Commune, Bacău County, Romania
Ţigăneşti, a village in Munteni Commune, Galați County, Romania
Ţigăneşti, a village in Ciolpani Commune, Ilfov County, Romania
Ţigăneştii de Beiuş, a village in Drăgăneşti Commune, Bihor County, Romania
Ţigăneştii de Criş, a village in Brusturi Commune, Bihor County, Romania
Ţigăneşti, Străşeni, a commune in Străşeni district, Moldova